The 1998-99 season was Motherwell's 1st season in the Scottish Premier League, and their 14th consecutive season in the top division of Scottish football.

First team squad

Competitions

Scottish Premier League

Results

Source:

Scottish Cup

Scottish League Cup

Source:

League table

Statistics

Appearances

|}

Source:

Top scorers

Source:

Disciplinary record

Overall

Scottish Premier League

Results summary

Results by round

Results by opponent

Source: 1998–99 Scottish Premier League article

See also
 List of Motherwell F.C. seasons

References

1998-99
Scottish football clubs 1998–99 season